Coral reefs in India are one of the most ancient and dynamic ecosystems of India. The coral reefs not only provide a sanctuary to a myriad of marine life but also play a key role in protecting the coastline from erosion. India has about 7517 km of coastline including islands but mainland coast is 6100 km.

The Coral reefs in India are mainly restricted to the Andaman and Nicobar Islands, Gulf of Mannar, Gulf of Kutch, Palk Strait and the Lakshadweep islands. All of these reefs are Fringing reefs, except Lakshadweep which are Atolls. There are Patchy corals present along the inter-tidal areas of the central west coast like the intertidal regions of Ratnagiri, Gaveshani Bank etc. The Hermatypic corals are also present along the sea shore  from Kollam in Kerala to Enayam Puthenthurai in Tamilnadu.

Research and Institutions

The Major Institutions in India involved in the management, monitoring and research on Coral reefs are the Ministry of Earth Sciences, the Zoological Survey of India, Central Marine Fisheries Research Institute, Madurai Kamaraj University, Annamalai University, National Centre for Earth Science Studies, National Institute of Ocean Technology, National Institute of Oceanography, India etc.

The Space Applications Centre in Ahmedabad is involved in the data collection of areas under Coral reefs using remote sensing.

Laws and regulations

The Ministry of Environment, Forest and Climate Change manages and guidelines for the protection of the Coral reefs in India. If the Coral reef region is under a protected area then it comes under the jurisdiction of the State Wild life department.

The Coastal Regulation Zone (CRZ) notification of 1991 gives protection to all marine resources. All types of coral reefs are protected under the CRZ1 category. Its Section 7 (2) prohibits the construction of beach resorts or hotels on coral reefs. In Certain States, the quarrying and collecting of massive corals are banned except for scientific purposes.

List of Coral reefs 

 Andaman and Nicobar Islands
Situated in the Bay of Bengal, exclusively fringing reefs of about 572 islands, most of these islands have a healthy biodiversity.

 Eastern Coast
There is a coral reef near the sea between Chandrabhaga coast and Ramachandi in the Konark area of Odisha.

 Gulf of Mannar
Fringing reefs with a chain of 21 islands from Rameswaram in the north to Thoothukudi (Tuticorin) in the south. This part of the gulf forms part of the Gulf of Mannar biosphere reserve.

 Gulf of Kutch
Exclusively consists of fringing reefs. The reefs are relatively less developed due to large range of temperature and high salinity. The harbours have less biodiversity. The entire Gulf of Kutch is also known as a marine national park.

 Lakshadweep
Exclusively coral atolls with 36 islands, of which 10 are inhabited.

 Western Coast
There are some coral reefs around small inlets in the western part of the Gulf of Khambat. Angria Bank is a coral reef off Vijaydurg in Maharashtra. Tarkarli in Malwan, Maharashtra is a smaller reef. There is a coral reef in Netrani Island in Karnataka.

Gallery

See also 

 Coastal India
 Fishing in India
 Central Indian Ridge
 Southeast Indian Ridge
 Southwest Indian Ridge
 Rodrigues Triple Junction
 Shiva crater
 Tourism in India
 List of islands in India
 List of beaches in India

References

Further reading 

 Coral Reefs in India – National Biodiversity Authority of India
 Official website – National Institute of Oceanography

Coral reefs
Reefs of India
India geography-related lists